The Naval Air Establishment was a division of the Chinese Navy established in 1918 in Mamoi to develop seaplanes for maritime reconnaissance, training, and torpedo-bombing. It was transferred to Shanghai in 1931.

Organization
 Captain Yu Tsao Barr
 Captain Tseng Yee King - Director General from 1931 onwards
 Captain Wong Tsoo
 Lieutenant S F Wong

Products
Early aircraft produced by the NAE were made of timber and fabric with assistance of foreign designers. Aircraft produced include:

 Chiang Hung (1930) - 2 or 3 seat touring plane and reconnaissance aircraft
 Chiang Hau (1932) - powered with single 165 hp Wright Whirlwind engine
 Chiang Gaen
 Nin Hai
 DH.6 like seaplane
 Beeng (1918?)- tractor biplane/float fighter bomber with single 360 hp prop engine
 Char 1918 - 2 seat primary trainer seaplane
 Ding (1934) - 2 seat bombing/torpedo seaplane using a single 360 hp Rolls-Royce engine
 Wu (1918?) - general purpose observation aircraft
 Yee (1918?) - 2 seat advance trainer and variant of Char seaplane

Facilities
 Government Dockyard and Engineering Works - Foochow Docks

Notes

References

 
 

Defunct aircraft manufacturers of China
1918 establishments in China
Defence companies of China